The Jumbo–Visma Development Team is a Dutch UCI Continental team which was founded in mid-2019, and started competing in the 2020 season onwards. It is part of the wider Jumbo–Visma team, developing younger riders.

Team roster
.

Major wins

2020
 National Under-23 Time Trial Championships, Finn Fisher-Black
 National Under-23 Road Race Championships, Finn Fisher-Black
Trofej Umag, Olav Kooij
Poreč Trophy, Olav Kooij
GP Kranj, Olav Kooij
Stage 1a Settimana Internazionale di Coppi e Bartali, Olav Kooij
Stage 4 Settimana Internazionale di Coppi e Bartali, Pascal Eenkhoorn
Stage 3 Bałtyk–Karkonosze Tour, Lars Boven
2021
 National Under-23 Time Trial Championships, Finn Fisher-Black
 Overall Istrian Spring Trophy, Finn Fisher-Black
Prologue, Lars Boven
 National Under-23 Time Trial Championships, Mick van Dijke
 National Under-23 Road Race Championships, Tim van Dijke
 National Under-23 Time Trial Championships, Michel Hessmann
Prologue (TTT) Tour Alsace
Stage 1 (TTT) Kreiz Breizh Elites
Stage 4 Kreiz Breizh Elites, Mick van Dijke
 Overall Tour du Pays de Montbéliard, Maurice Ballerstedt
Stage 2, Loe van Belle
Stage 3, Maurice Ballerstedt
 Overall Flanders Tomorrow Tour, Mick van Dijke
Stage 1, Loe van Belle
Stages 3a (ITT) & 4, Mick van Dijke
 Overall Ronde de l'Isard, Gijs Leemreize
Stage 3, Johannes Staune-Mittet
Stage 5, Gijs Leemreize
2022
Stage 3b Le Triptyque des Monts et Chateaux, Per Strand Hagenes
Stage 2 Oberösterreich Rundfahrt, Per Strand Hagenes
 Overall Flanders Tomorrow Tour, Lars Boven
Stage 2, Lars Boven
 Overall Ronde de l'Isard, Johannes Staune-Mittet
Stage 1, Johannes Staune-Mittet
Stage 2a (TTT)
Stage 5, Archie Ryan
Paris–Tours Espoirs, Per Strand Hagenes

National champions
2020
 New Zealand Under–23 Time Trial, Finn Fisher-Black
 New Zealand Under–23 Road Race, Finn Fisher-Black
 Germany Under–23 Cross Country, Michel Hessmann
2021
 New Zealand Under–23 Time Trial, Finn Fisher-Black
 Netherlands Under–23 Time Trial, Mick van Dijke
 Netherlands Under–23 Road Race, Tim van Dijke
 Germany Under–23 Time Trial, Michel Hessmann

See also
Team Jumbo–Visma (men's team)
Team Jumbo–Visma (women's team)

Notes

References

External links

UCI Continental Teams (Europe)
Cycling teams based in the Netherlands
Cycling teams established in 2019
2019 establishments in the Netherlands